Lawrie Lee Hooper is a Welsh-born Manx politician who is the leader of Liberal Vannin Party and current Minister for the Department of Enterprise. He represented Ramsey in the House of Keys from 2016.

Early life

Hooper was born in Cardiff, Wales. He studied at Ramsey Grammar School and Keele University.

He trained and qualified as a Chartered Accountant at PricewaterhouseCoopers on the Isle of Man with a focus on Audit. He then spent four years working as a Manager at Crowe Morgan.

Political career

Hooper stood unsuccessfully for the House of Keys as an independent candidate in 2011. He served as a Ramsey Town Commissioner between April 2012 and September 2016, including as chairman for the 2016/17 term until his election to the House of Keys in 2016 as a Liberal Vannin candidate.

Hooper became leader of the Liberal Vannin Party in August 2020.

Election results

2011

2016

References 

Living people
Liberal Vannin Party politicians
Members of the House of Keys 2016–2021
Year of birth missing (living people)